Noureddine Bouchaal (born 24 October 1970) is a Moroccan alpine skier. He competed in the men's giant slalom at the 1992 Winter Olympics.

References

1970 births
Living people
Moroccan male alpine skiers
Olympic alpine skiers of Morocco
Alpine skiers at the 1992 Winter Olympics
Place of birth missing (living people)
20th-century Moroccan people